Otomo, or Ōtomo, is a Japanese surname. Otomo may also refer to:

 Otomo (automobile), automobile produced between 1924–1927
 Otomo (comics), character in the Marvel Comics universe
 Otomo (film), a 1999 German film* Ōtomo clan, a samurai clan
 Ōtomo clan, a samurai clan
 Otomo Station, train station in Iwate Prefecture, Japan
 3911 Otomo, Main-belt asteroid
 Otomo, a fictional character in RoboCop 3
 Otomo, a song by Bonobo from the album Fragments